= West Coast Rap-The First Dynasty =

Compilation album by various artists
- Released: 1992
- Recorded: Los Angeles, California US
- Label: Rhino Records
- Producer: DJ Flash

West Coast Rap - The First Dynasty, is a four volume album of the birth and rise of West Coast Rap.

The First Dynasty series was produced and compiled by Lee "DJ Flash" Johnson of The Rappers Rap Group. The compilation was released in 1992 on Rhino Records. The four volume set was met with critical acclaim and the extensive liner notes were the first accurate documentation of the true roots of West Coast Rap.
